The Whitfield Prize (or Whitfield Book Prize) is a prize of £1,000 awarded annually by the Royal Historical Society to the best work on a subject of British or Irish history published within the United Kingdom or Republic of Ireland during the calendar year. To be eligible for the award, the book must be the first history work published by the author.

History of the prize
The prize was founded in 1976 out of the bequest of Archibald Stenton Whitfield. Originally, the prize was £400; five years later, it was increased to £600.  Currently, the prize is £1,000.

Previous winners
Source: Royal Historical Society

See also

 Alan Ball Local History Awards
 Gladstone Prize
 List of history awards
 Wolfson History Prize

References

British literary awards
Awards established in 1977
1977 establishments in the United Kingdom
History awards
First book awards